Highway 21 (AR 21, Ark. 21, and Hwy. 21) is a north–south state highway in north central Arkansas. The route of  runs from US Route 64 (US 64) in Clarksville north across US 62 to Missouri Route 13 at the Missouri state line The route is a two-lane highway with the exception of a brief concurrency with US 62, a four-lane highway, in Berryville.

Route description

The route begins at US 64 in Clarksville near the Clarksville Municipal Airport and runs north to the Ozark National Forest. Highway 21 runs north to intersect Highway 292 near Ludwig and Ludwig Lake near Hillcrest in Johnson County. The route begins a concurrency with Highway 16 until Edwards Junction when Highway 21 turns north and serves as a southern terminus for Highway 43 at Boxley. Upon entering Madison County the highway intersects Highway 74 in Kingston and passes the Bank of Kingston, a property on the National Register of Historic Places. Continuing north, Highway 21 intersects US 412 along the Carroll County line.

Its southern terminus is officially at US 64 just east of Clarksville, though northbound it is posted as beginning at Interstate 40 running north along . The route is signed as a destination at exit 58 from Interstate 40 in Clarksville. Highway 21 is signed as running northbound along Highway 103 for  then running east along US 64 for  before meeting the true southern terminus.

Ozark Highlands Scenic Byway

A portion of Highway 21 was designated as the Ozark Highlands Scenic Byway in 2005 by the Arkansas State Highway and Transportation Department (AHTD). The byway begins at the southern terminus of Highway 21 at US 64 in Clarksville and runs north to the Buffalo National River near Boxley. Wildlife and scenic views are frequent along the nearly  route.  The highway is popular as a major route to the Ozark National Forest, the Ozark Highlands Trail, and the White River in addition to being the major travel route to cities in the area and points in southern Missouri.

Major intersections
Mile markers reset at some concurrencies.

See also

 Arkansas Highway 21E
 Arkansas Highway 221

Notes

References

External links

021
Transportation in Carroll County, Arkansas
Transportation in Johnson County, Arkansas
Transportation in Madison County, Arkansas
Transportation in Newton County, Arkansas